PA8 may refer to:
 Pennsylvania Route 8
 Pennsylvania's 8th congressional district
 Piper PA-8, a light aircraft of the 1940s
 Pitcairn PA-8 Super Mailwing, a biplane of the 1930s